= Takurua =

Takurua was a Māori woman from the Ngāpuhi tribe (iwi) in northern New Zealand.

Takurua signed the Treaty of Waitangi in 1840. She was one of a select few Māori women who signed the treaty. While the date of her signing is currently unknown, some speculate that the signing took place in the Bay of Islands. While further research is needed, one source indicates that she was the daughter of Te Kēmara and was married to Te Tai.

Takurua is also the Māori name for Sirius, the brightest extrasolar star visible from Earth.
